Robert Reece was a playwright.

Robert Reece may also refer to:
Bob Reece (born 1951), American former baseball player

See also
Robert Rees (disambiguation)
Robert Rhys, former editor of Barn